Bihar State Road Transport Corporation or BSRTC is a state-owned road transportation company in Bihar with compared to other Indian states it is facing financial crisis in term of government funding, which degrade its process of expanding basic infrastructural assets both HR and number of buses in BSRTC, as par to 3 tier cities public transportation system. BSRTC was set up in 1959 under the provisions of Road Transport Corporation Act, 1950. It is wholly owned by the Government of Bihar. In year 2020 Chief Minister of Bihar inaugurated Pataliputra Bus Terminal commonly known as ISBT, Patna. It is the first ISBT of Bihar.

History
Prior to May 1959, road transport services in Bihar were managed by Rajya Transport, which was set up in the year 1953 with the nationalisation of some routes in the state. Rajya Transport and Communication, Government of Bihar and was departmentally administered till it was transferred in May 1959 to Bihar State Road Transport Corporation (BSRTC), a statutory corporation created under the provisions of the State Road Transport Corporation Act, 1950.

Total capital invested in BSRTC till March 1983 was 53.9 crores out of which 24.77 crores was the share capital of the state government and 465 crores loans from the same source, while 24.48 crores was contributed from other sources in the shape of shares and loans. Investment in BSRTC was second largest investment made by the Bihar Government, after Bihar State Electricity Board.

Currently the Administrator of Bihar State Road Transport Corporation is Shrimati Basu Priya, IAS.

Patna City Bus Service
This service is started on 3 May 2018 by BSRTC that was inaugurated by Hon'ble Chief Minister of Bihar Shri Nitish Kumar from Gyan Bhawan, Gandhi Maidan at two routes i.e. Gandhi Maidan to Danapur (111) and the second one is from Gandhi Maidan to Danapur Railway Station (111A). Later on, Bihar State Road Transport Corporation had started city bus service on various routes of Patna and nearby. Almost 50 thousands passenger travels through city bus services across all routes. But as per the demands of the daily passengers it needs to bring new buses on all routes to enhance the quality and safety of the passengers.

Inter State Bus Service
BSRTC recently started the service of luxury Volvo buses from Patna and Kishanganj to Ghaziabad (Delhi NCR)

References

External links
Official website of Bihar Transport Department
Bihar Transport Department on Parivahan Sarathi Portal

State agencies of Bihar
Transport in Bihar
Bus companies of India
State road transport corporations of India
Companies based in Patna
Companies based in Bihar
Indian companies established in 1953
1953 establishments in Bihar
Government agencies established in 1953
Transport companies established in 1953